Saimiriine betaherpesvirus 4 (SaHV-4) is a species of virus in the genus Cytomegalovirus, subfamily Betaherpesvirinae, family Herpesviridae, and order Herpesvirales.

References

External links
 

Betaherpesvirinae